The 3rd Golden Raspberry Awards were held on April 11, 1983, at an Oscar night potluck party to recognize the worst the film industry had to offer in 1982.

Winners and nominees

Films with multiple nominations 
These films garnered multiple nominations:

Criticism 
Despite the film being critically panned at the time of its release, the award show was criticized in later years for the nomination of Ennio Morricone's score for John Carpenter's The Thing for Worst Musical Score.

See also

 1982 in film
 55th Academy Awards
 36th British Academy Film Awards
 40th Golden Globe Awards

References

External links
 Official summary of awards
 Nomination and award listing  at the Internet Movie Database

Golden Raspberry Awards
03
1982 in American cinema
April 1983 events in the United States
Golden Raspberry